Georgina Farman (born 12 February 1991) is an English ice hockey defender, currently playing with Göteborg HC of the Swedish Women's Hockey League (SDHL) and internationally with Team GB. She is the first British player to play in the SDHL.

Career    
Having grown up in Hull, Farman began playing for the Sheffield Shadows in the top flight of British women's hockey by the age of 14. In 2013, she left the UK to move to Sweden, to play for IF Norrköping in Damettan. After scoring 37 points in 17 games with the club, she was signed by Linköping HC ahead of the 2014-15 Riksserien season.

References

External links 
 

1991 births
Living people
English women's ice hockey defencemen
Göteborg HC players
Linköping HC Dam players
Brynäs IF Dam players